In Greek mythology, Rhene (Ancient Greek: Ῥήνη) may refer to the following personages:

 Rhene, a nymph of Mount Cyllene. She was the lover of Hermes and mother by him of Saon (or Samon) of Samothrace.
 Rhene, also a nymph who was a paramour of Oileus and mother of his son Medon, although some suggest that Oileus fathered Medon with Alcimache. In one source, Rhene is given as the mother of Oileus' another son, Ajax the Lesser, as well, though the latter is more commonly said to be the son of Oileus' legitimate wife Eriopis.

Notes

References 

 Diodorus Siculus, The Library of History translated by Charles Henry Oldfather. Twelve volumes. Loeb Classical Library. Cambridge, Massachusetts: Harvard University Press; London: William Heinemann, Ltd. 1989. Vol. 3. Books 4.59–8. Online version at Bill Thayer's Web Site
 Diodorus Siculus, Bibliotheca Historica. Vol 1-2. Immanel Bekker. Ludwig Dindorf. Friedrich Vogel. in aedibus B. G. Teubneri. Leipzig. 1888–1890. Greek text available at the Perseus Digital Library.
 Dionysus of Halicarnassus, Roman Antiquities. English translation by Earnest Cary in the Loeb Classical Library, 7 volumes. Harvard University Press, 1937–1950. Online version at Bill Thayer's Web Site
Dionysius of Halicarnassus, Antiquitatum Romanarum quae supersunt, Vol I-IV. . Karl Jacoby. In Aedibus B.G. Teubneri. Leipzig. 1885. Greek text available at the Perseus Digital Library.
 Gaius Julius Hyginus, Fabulae from The Myths of Hyginus translated and edited by Mary Grant. University of Kansas Publications in Humanistic Studies. Online version at the Topos Text Project.
 Homer, The Iliad with an English Translation by A.T. Murray, Ph.D. in two volumes. Cambridge, MA., Harvard University Press; London, William Heinemann, Ltd. 1924. . Online version at the Perseus Digital Library.
Homer, Homeri Opera in five volumes. Oxford, Oxford University Press. 1920. . Greek text available at the Perseus Digital Library.

Nymphs
Locrian characters in Greek mythology